This article details the dialling protocol for reaching Hungarian telephone numbers from within Hungary. The standard landline number consists of 6 numerals except those in Budapest which have 7 numerals, as do mobile numbers. Before keying the subscriber number required, a caller may need to enter a domestic code (06) and an area code.

Hungary area codes
In Hungary the standard lengths for area codes is two, except for Budapest (the capital), which has the area code 1.  Landline numbers are six digits in general; numbers in Budapest and mobile numbers are seven digits.

Making calls within and from Hungary
Calls within local areas can be made by dialling the number without the area code, such as 123 4567 in Budapest or 123 456 in other areas. However, this is not permitted in mobile phone networks.

Domestic calls to all other area codes must be preceded with 06 + area code. For example, a call from Budapest to Monor (area code 29) would be made as 06 29 123 456 and a call from Monor to Budapest (area code 1) would be made as 06 1 234 5678. When using mobile phones, the international format can be used instead: +36 1 234 5678.

Calls to international destinations are in the format 00 + country code + number. On mobile phones, + can be used instead of 00.

Making calls from abroad
Calls to local areas from abroad can be made using the international prefix + country code + area code. 
The national trunk code 06 used inside Hungary shall not be dialed from abroad. 
For example, a call to Monor (area code 29) would be made as +36 29 123 456 or 00 36 29 123 456, where the +36 or the 0036 prefixes represent the country code of Hungary.

Short numbers

Certain services can be called with a short number, ignoring the above scheme.
112 - Emergency number (ambulance, fire brigade, police)
104 - Ambulance
105 - Fire Brigade
107 - Police
143 - Telephone fault reporting
180 - Time service
188 - Roadside assistance
193 - Alarm service
197 - Yellow Pages directory assistance
198 - National directory assistance
199 - International directory assistance

List of area codes

1     area code for Budapest 
20    mobile network of Yettel
21    Location independent electronic communications service numbers
22    area code for Székesfehérvár
23    area code for Biatorbágy
24    area code for Szigetszentmiklós
25    area code for Dunaújváros
26    area code for Szentendre
27    area code for Vác
28    area code for Gödöllő
29    area code for Monor
30    mobile network of Magyar Telekom
31    UPC Mobil and several smaller mobile services
32    area code for Salgótarján
33    area code for Esztergom
34    area code for Tatabánya
35    area code for Balassagyarmat
36    area code for Eger
37    area code for Gyöngyös
40    retired (previously shared-cost service)
41    retired (previously special services)
42    area code for Nyíregyháza
44    area code for Mátészalka
45    area code for Kisvárda
46    area code for Miskolc
47    area code for Szerencs
48    area code for Ózd
49    area code for Mezőkövesd
50    mobile network of Digi Mobil
51    Dial-Up Internet service
52    area code for Debrecen
53    area code for Cegléd
54    area code for Berettyóújfalu
55    Test number
56    area code for Szolnok
57    area code for Jászberény
59    area code for Karcag
60    reserved/retired - former Westel 0660 mobile network on 450 MHz
61    reserved for later use
62    area code for Szeged
63    area code for Szentes
66    area code for Békéscsaba
68    area code for Orosháza
69    area code for Mohács
70    mobile network of Vodafone
71    corporate networks
72    area code for Pécs
73    area code for Szigetvár
74    area code for Szekszárd
75    area code for Paks
76    area code for Kecskemét
77    area code for Kiskunhalas
78    area code for Kiskőrös
79    area code for Baja
80    freephone service (national)
81    retired - previously: IN
82    area code for Kaposvár
83    area code for Keszthely
84    area code for Siófok
85    area code for Marcali
87    area code for Tapolca
88    area code for Veszprém
89    area code for Pápa
90    Premium-rate service (national) 
91    Premium-rate service (national) - previously: IP VPN
92    area code for Zalaegerszeg
93    area code for Nagykanizsa
94    area code for Szombathely
95    area code for Sárvár
96    area code for Győr
99    area code for Sopron

Mobile phone codes 

In ascending numeric order

Note: After April 1, 2004, the phone numbers can be carried from network to network. That means any of the previous codes can refer to any mobile provider.

References 

Hungary
Hungary communications-related lists
Telecommunications in Hungary